A total solar eclipse occurred on August 30, 1905. A solar eclipse occurs when the Moon passes between Earth and the Sun, thereby totally or partly obscuring the image of the Sun for a viewer on Earth. A total solar eclipse occurs when the Moon's apparent diameter is larger than the Sun's, blocking all direct sunlight, turning day into darkness. Totality occurs in a narrow path across Earth's surface, with the partial solar eclipse visible over a surrounding region thousands of kilometres wide. Totality was visible from Canada, Newfoundland Colony (now belonging to Canada), Spain, French Algeria (now Algeria), French Tunisia (now Tunisia), Ottoman Tripolitania (now Libya) include the capital Tripoli, Egypt, Ottoman Empire (the parts now belonging to Saudi Arabia) including Mecca, Emirate of Jabal Shammar (now belonging to Saudi Arabia), Aden Protectorate (now belonging to Yemen), and Muscat and Oman (now Oman).

This eclipse was observed from Alcalà de Xivert in Spain. It was also observed by members of the British Astronomical Association from various locations.

Related eclipses

Solar eclipses of 1902–1907

Solar 143

Inex series 

In the 19th century:
 Solar saros 140: total solar eclipse of October 29, 1818
 Solar saros 141: annular solar eclipse of October 9, 1847
 Solar saros 142: total solar eclipse of September 17, 1876

In the 22nd century:
 Solar saros 150: partial solar eclipse of April 11, 2108
 Solar saros 151: annular solar eclipse of March 21, 2137
 Solar saros 152: total solar eclipse of March 2, 2166
 Solar saros 153: annular solar eclipse of February 10, 2195

Notes

References

 The total solar eclipse 1905: Reports of observations made by members of the ... By British Astronomical Association, Frederick William Levander
 Report of the solar eclipse expedition to Palma, Majorca, August 30, 1905 ... By Solar Physics Committee, Norman Lockyer
 Sketchs of Solar Corona August 30, 1905
 Sketchs from Russia expedition for solar Corona August 30, 1905 (2)

1905 08 30
1905 in science
1905 08 30
August 1905 events